Maximum Conviction is a 2012 action thriller starring Steven Seagal and Steve Austin and directed by Keoni Waxman.

Plot
It should be an easy day's work for former black ops operative Cross (Steven Seagal) and his partner Manning (Stone Cold Steve Austin). They and their group have been hired to oversee and orchestrate the decommissioning of a secret military penal facility, and organize the transport of the inmates to their new civilian prison.

Cross shows who's boss early on by beating up a large inmate who steps out of line, while Manning is given the task of running the prison's garbage facility. The day gets worse when a rolled up note is found that was accidentally dropped by an inmate, detailing times and locations for an attack on the facility.

Cross, on his way back to the prison from running an errand, and Manning, still dealing with that garbage facility, are suddenly involved in a foothold situation as Chris Blake (Michael Pare) and his mercenaries, posing as marshals, take over the complex.

Blake and his men are after the two newest inmates—Samantha Mendez (Steph Song) and Charlotte Walker (Aliyah O'Brien)—for their own purposes—Blake wants the information that is in an implant that is inside of Samantha, who is a CIA courier, because it could lead to a lot of money for Blake, and it turns out that Charlotte is working for Blake. It is up to Cross, Manning, and their team to stop Blake and his men.

MP Fields turns out to be a traitor and kills two of the others. Blake cuts off Warden Samuel's finger to force him to know where the detainees are. Manning is attacked Collins and his team. He manages to kill two and flee the area. Cross returns to the complex and kills two of Blake's men. Blake holds Warden Samuels hostage, forcing him to do anything so Blake can reach Charlotte. Later on Charlotte escapes as she wants to get paid. Eventually both sides meet up. Blake thinks he has Cross and Manning outgunned and then flees the scene, with Cross pursuing him. Manning catches up with Collins and kills him by impaling him on a bench. Samantha kills Charlotte, while the remnants of Blake's mercenaries including MP Fields are killed by Bradley and the others. Cross and Blake exchange gunshots till both run out of ammo. Blake attempts to strike Cross only to be thrashed around and badly injured. Cross talks to him about being a warrior in which Blake replies 'well that's me im the fucking bad guy'. Cross says he is the good guy then hurls Blake into the laser trip wires, killing him. He reunites with Samantha and Manning. He jokes that 'in ain't over till we're dead'.

Cast
Steven Seagal – Cross - Tactical Genius
Steve Austin – Manning  - Weapons Expert
Michael Paré – Chris Blake - Antagonist and leader of Mercenaries
Steph Song – Samantha - Detainee who worked for CIA
Michael Adamthwaite – Collins - Blake's Henchman
Dean Redman – Jones
Bren Foster - Bradley
Zak Santiago - Blake's henchman and former head of Security
Ian Robison - The Prison Warden

References

External links

2012 films
2012 direct-to-video films
2012 action thriller films
American action thriller films
Direct-to-video action films
Voltage Pictures films
Films directed by Keoni Waxman
2010s English-language films
2010s American films